Tariq Aziz (born 9 September 1974) is a Pakistani cricketer who plays for the Portugal cricket team. He played five first-class matches for Hyderabad in the 1999/00 season.

In August 2018, he represented Portugal in Group A of the 2018–19 ICC T20 World Cup Europe Qualifier tournament. In Portugal's second match, against France, he was named as the player of the match, after taking three wickets and scoring 48 runs. He finished as the leading run-scorer for the team in the qualifier, with 99 runs from four matches.

In October 2019, he was named in Portugal's Twenty20 International (T20I) squad for the 2019 Iberia Cup tournament. He made his Twenty20 International (T20I) debut for Portugal, against Spain, on 25 October 2019.

References

External links
 

1974 births
Living people
Pakistani cricketers
Hyderabad (Pakistan) cricketers
Portuguese cricketers
Portugal Twenty20 International cricketers
Place of birth missing (living people)